World Christian Encyclopedia is a reference work, with its third edition published by Edinburgh University Press in November 2019. The WCE is known for providing membership statistics for major world religions and Christian denominations including historical data and projections of future populations.

The data incorporated into the World Christian Encyclopedia have been made available online at the World Christian Database (WCD).

Editions

1st - 1982
The first edition, World Christian Encyclopedia: A Comparative Survey of Churches and Religions in the Modern World A.D. 1900–2000 (WCE), by David B. Barrett, was published in 1982 by Oxford University Press. Barrett was a trained aeronautical engineer who became a missionary with the Church Missionary Society (Anglican). He arrived in Nyanza Province in Western Kenya in 1957. Over the course of 14 years he traveled to 212 of 223 countries and corresponded with Christians all over the world in search of the most up-to-date statistics on Christianity and world religions. His research resulted in the first edition of the World Christian Encyclopedia in 1982.

2nd - 2001
Barrett moved to Richmond, Virginia in 1985 to work with the Southern Baptists on missionary strategy. He continued his research as an independent researcher, joined by Todd M. Johnson in 1988. With George Kurian, Barrett and Johnson produced the second edition of the World Christian Encyclopedia, in 2 volumes, in 2001 (Oxford University Press).

3rd - 2019
The third edition, written and edited by Todd M. Johnson and Gina A. Zurlo (Barrett died in 2011), was released in November 2019. Johnson and Zurlo are co-directors of the Center for the Study of Global Christianity at Gordon-Conwell Theological Seminary (South Hamilton, MA, USA).

Reception
One study found that the WCD's data was "highly correlated with other sources that offer cross-national religious composition estimates" but the database "consistently gives a higher estimate for percent Christian in comparison to other cross-national data sets". Concern has also been raised about possible bias because the World Christian Encyclopedia was originally developed as a Christian missionary tool.

Margit Warburg, a Danish researcher, has argued that the database contains numerical inaccuracies in its statistics on the Baháʼí Faith. She noted that figures given in WCE for some Western countries are highly exaggerated. For instance, the World Christian Encyclopedia reports an estimated 1,600 Baháʼís in Denmark in 1995 and 682,000 Baháʼís in the US in 1995. According to her, the Baháʼís themselves do not acknowledge such numbers; the number of registered Baháʼís in Denmark, in 1995, was about 240 and in the number in the USA was about 130,000.

References

External links
Edinburgh University Press: World Christian Encyclopedia
World Christian Database
Center for the Study of Global Christianity

1982 non-fiction books
2001 non-fiction books
Encyclopedias of religion
Religious studies books
Books on Christian missions
Kenyan books
American encyclopedias
Oxford University Press reference books
21st-century encyclopedias
World Christianity